is a private university in Niigata, Niigata, Japan. It was established in 1994.

External links
 Official website 

Educational institutions established in 1994
Private universities and colleges in Japan
Niigata (city)
Universities and colleges in Niigata Prefecture
1994 establishments in Japan